The Swing Sessions 2 is the fourth studio album from Australian swing singer/actor David Campbell and was released in October 2007.

The Swing Sessions 2 followed the suit of its predecessor The Swing Sessions as a nod to many great swing singers of the past; with tracks recorded by Campbell with a slightly more modern slant. The Swing Sessions 2 achieved platinum sales in Australia.

Track listing
 "Witchcraft" - Cy Coleman 1957
 "Perhaps, Perhaps Perhaps" - Nat "King" Cole 1949
 "Lazy River" - Hoagy Carmichael & Sidney Arodin 1930
 "Route 66" - Nat King Cole 1946
 "I've Got a Crush on You" - George Gershwin & Ira Gershwin 1928
 "Danke Schoen" - Bert Kaempfert 1962
 "Just a Gigolo/I Ain't Got Nobody" - Louis Prima 1956
 "Begin the Beguine" - Cole Porter 1935
 "That Old Black Magic" - Harold Arlen & Johnny Mercer 1942
 "Summer Wind" Henry Mayer & - Johnny Mercer 1965
 "There Will Never Be Another You" - Harry Warren & Mack Gordon 1942
 "That's Life" - Frank Sinatra 1966
 "One For My Baby" - Harold Arlen & Johnny Mercer 1943
 "King of the Road" - Roger Miller 1965

Charts

Weekly charts

Year-end charts

Certifications

References

2007 albums
David Campbell (Australian musician) albums
Covers albums
Sony Music Australia albums